Jordan Mathews (born June 22, 1994) is an American professional basketball player for Spójnia Stargard of the Polish Basketball League (PLK). He played in college for California and Gonzaga.

College career
Out of Santa Monica High School, Mathews was a top recruit out of high school for California. He had a solid freshman campaign under coach Mike Montgomery and had a 32-point game versus Oregon. As a sophomore, Mathews averaged 13.6 points per game. He posted 13.5 points per game as a junior and earned his degree after taking six classes in 12 weeks. He opted to transfer to Gonzaga for his final collegiate season because he did not have a great relationship with Golden Bears coach Cuonzo Martin.

Mathews endured a brief shooting slump in February 2017 but rebounded to make three 3-pointers and score 15 points in a win over San Diego. Mathews hit the go-ahead 3-pointer with under a minute to go in the Sweet 16 win over West Virginia and finished with 13 points. As a senior at Gonzaga, Mathews 10.6 points, 3.3 rebounds and 1.5 assists per game in helping the Bulldogs reach the National Championship game. He hit a team-high 85 3-pointers.

Professional career
After going undrafted in the 2017 NBA draft, Mathews joined the New Orleans Pelicans in the NBA Summer League. On September 21, 2017, Mathews signed with the Atlanta Hawks. He was released on October 13 as one of the team’s final preseason roster cuts. Mathews joined the Erie BayHawks of the NBA G League. He came off the bench for a team-high 20 points in a 115-96 loss to the Fort Wayne Mad Ants on March 17, 2018. Mathews averaged 8.8 points in 48 games in his rookie season, shooting 38.4 percent from the field. He signed with the Los Angeles Clippers in the 2018 Summer League.

On July 26, 2018, Mathews joined Team FOG Næstved of Denmark's Basketligaen.

On July 18, 2019, he signed with Vanoli Cremona of the Lega Basket Serie A. 

On January 17, 2021, he has signed with BC Enisey of the VTB United League.

On August 3, 2022, he has signed with Spójnia Stargard of the Polish Basketball League (PLK).

Personal life
Mathews is the older brother of professional basketball player Jonah Mathews. His father, Phil Mathews, is the head coach of Riverside City College.

References

External links
Gonzaga Bulldogs bio

1994 births
Living people
American expatriate basketball people in Denmark
American expatriate basketball people in Italy
American men's basketball players
Basketball players from Los Angeles
California Golden Bears men's basketball players
Erie BayHawks (2017–2019) players
Gonzaga Bulldogs men's basketball players
Lega Basket Serie A players
Shooting guards
Spójnia Stargard players
Vanoli Cremona players